Shahzada Saeed-ur-Rasheed Abbasi is a former Federal  Minister of the Government of Pakistan and the son of the last ruling Monarch of  the Bahawalpur Kingdom, Sir Sadiq Muhammad Khan Abbasi V.

He petitioned the desealing of his ancestral Sadiqgarh Palace and auctioned off the antiques. He is the brother of Prince Aminul Rashid Abbasi. The cars (14 Rolls-Royces, Renaults and Cadillacs) alone fetched a 10 million Rupee Mark

References

Pakistani MNAs 1990–1993
Year of birth missing (living people)
Living people
Place of birth missing (living people)
Pakistani MNAs 1993–1996
Pakistani MNAs 1997–1999
Bahawalpur royal family
Pakistani MNAs 1977
Federal ministers of Pakistan